Aleksandar Aleksandrov (born 28 March 1994) is a Bulgarian footballer who plays as a midfielder for Lokomotiv Sofia.

International career 
On 21 May 2013, Aleksandrov was called up to the Under-21 squad by manager Mihail Madanski for the European Championship qualifying games against Andorra on 1 and 5 June.

On 11 December 2018 Lokomotiv Sofia announced that Aleksandrov had returned to the club for the second time.

Honours

Club
CSKA Sofia
 Bulgarian Cup: 2015–16

References

External links 

Living people
1993 births
Bulgarian footballers
Association football midfielders
First Professional Football League (Bulgaria) players
PFC Minyor Pernik players
PFC Slavia Sofia players
PFC CSKA Sofia players
Neftochimic Burgas players
FC Lokomotiv 1929 Sofia players
FC Dunav Ruse players